Robert Durso is an Italian-American pianist, born in 1959. Mr. Durso was educated at the Peabody Conservatory, Indiana University Bloomington and Temple University. His principal teachers were Enrica Cavallo-Gulli, Harvey Wedeen, Edna Golandsky, Dorothy Taubman, and Rosalyn Tureck.

Mr. Durso has given concerts, lectured and conducted master classes in Venezuela, Israel, Rome, Vienna, Zurich, Switzerland, Brussel, and England. Robert Durso is a founding member of the Belmonte Trio along with Jennifer K. Lee and Glenn Fischbach.

Mr. Durso is also co-founder and senior director and faculty member of the Golandsky Institute, held annually at Princeton University.

Sources
 www.golandskyinstitute.org
 http://www.pianomap.com
 http://www.robertdurso.net
 http://www.privatelessons.com
 www.castelfranc.com
 www.frederick.edu
 www.effortlessartistry.com
 www.taubman-tapes.com

Living people
1959 births
20th-century American male musicians
21st-century American male musicians
American male pianists
Jacobs School of Music alumni
Temple University alumni
Peabody Institute alumni